The Kuznetsk Basin (Кузбасс; often abbreviated as Kuzbass or Kuzbas) in southwestern Siberia, Russia, is one of the largest coal mining areas in Russia, covering an area of around . It lies in the Kuznetsk Depression between Tomsk and Novokuznetsk in the basin of the Tom River. From the south it borders the Abakan Range, from the west Salair Ridge, and Kuznetsk Alatau from the east.

Overall coal deposits are estimated at 725 billion tonnes. The region's other industries, such as machine construction, chemicals and metallurgy, are based on coal mining.

History 
Coal deposits in the area were first discovered in 1721.

During the Soviet era, the Kuznetsk Basin was second only to Ukraine's Donets Basin in terms of regional coal production. Iron smelting began there as early as 1697 and coal was discovered in 1721, although it was not systematically mined until 1851. The late 19th century industrialisation of Russia prompted a rapid growth in the area's industries, which was further boosted by the completion of the Trans-Siberian Railway. Under Joseph Stalin's first five-year plan, the Ural-Kuznetsk industrial combine was formed in the early 1930s. It became a centre for the production of iron and steel, zinc, aluminium, machinery and chemicals, with raw materials and finished products being shipped to and from sites in the Kuzbas and Urals.

A series of coal miners strikes in the late 1980s took place in the region, and gained the support from the sanctioned All-Union Central Council of Trade Unions. Following the dissolution of the Soviet Union and the collapse of the planned economy, the region's industries faced a further crisis. Since then, however, its significance has grown. The Kuzbass now extracts ca. 60 percent of Russia's total coal production and is the main fuel and energy base for eastern Russia.

Administratively, the Kuznetsk Basin lies in Kemerovo Oblast with its capital in the city of Kemerovo. Other major cities in the area include Anzhero-Sudzhensk, Leninsk-Kuznetsky, Kiselyovsk, and Prokopyevsk.

Pollution 
The large amount of coal mining in the region resulted in significant pollution. In a report done by the Central Intelligence Agency, the region was said to be home of "environmental problems" which were "causing increasing deaths and genetic defects among babies". A study by the British Geological Survey found that "Annual methane emissions into the atmosphere from Kuzbass coal mines amount to 1–2 billion cubic metres", with much of that coming from now abandoned mines.

See also

 Coal in Russia
 Kuzbass Autonomous Industrial Colony

References

External links 
Britannica.com: Kuznetsk Coal Basin
Kemerovo Region Overview: Russia's Coal Center, in Statistical Business Profile for the Siberian Federal District of the Russian Federation, pages 358+.

Coal mining regions in Asia
Coal mining regions in Russia
Geography of Kemerovo Oblast
Geography of Russia
Geology of Russia
Sedimentary basins of Russia